The Communauté de communes Gérardmer Hautes Vosges is an administrative association of rural communes in the Vosges department of eastern France. It was created on 1 January 2022 from part of the Communauté de communes des Hautes Vosges. It consists of 8 communes, and has its administrative offices at Gérardmer. Its area is 196.4 km2, and its population was 14,256 in 2019 (geography as of January 2022).

Composition 
The association comprises 8 communes:

Champdray
Gérardmer
Granges-Aumontzey
Liézey
Rehaupal
Le Tholy
Le Valtin
Xonrupt-Longemer

References

Commune communities in France
Intercommunalities of Vosges